Joan Verdú Fernández (born 5 May 1983) is a Spanish professional footballer.

A versatile midfielder, adept as both central or attacking midfielder, he started professionally at Barcelona, but played mainly for local rivals Espanyol during his career, amassing La Liga totals of 262 games and 35 goals over nine seasons and also representing in the competition Deportivo, Betis and Levante.

Club career
Born in Barcelona, Catalonia, Verdú was a product of FC Barcelona's youth system. He played mainly for its B side as a senior, making his debut with the main squad on 27 October 2004 in a 1–0 away loss against UDA Gramenet in the round of 64 of the Copa del Rey; his second and last appearance took place on 7 December, in a 2–0 defeat at FC Shakhtar Donetsk for the group stage of the UEFA Champions League.

Verdú moved to Deportivo de La Coruña for 2006–07, being relatively used by the Galicians throughout the season and scoring in a 2–0 away win over Villarreal CF on 11 February 2007. He produced similar numbers in his second year in La Liga.

Profiting from Juan Carlos Valerón's age and recurrent physical problems, Verdú had a breakthrough year in the 2008–09 campaign, often assuming the playmaking duties of the former while also adding seven league goals. However, after a new deal could not be agreed, the free agent moved back to his native region after three years, signing a four-year contract with RCD Espanyol.

Verdú netted against his previous team on 19 September 2009 in a 3–2 away victory, and started most of his first year, also benefitting from age and injury-related problems of another teammate, Iván de la Peña. Without any real competitor the following season – de la Peña only saw 30 minutes of action– he improved his numbers to 37 games and five goals, as the Pericos finished comfortably in midtable.

In summer 2013, free agent Verdú signed a four-year deal with another club in that tier, Real Betis. After suffering relegation, he went on to represent in quick succession Baniyas Club (United Arab Emirates), ACF Fiorentina (Italy) and Levante UD.

On 12 January 2017, the 33-year-old Verdú moved to the China League One with Qingdao Huanghai FC, where he shared teams with compatriot Martí Crespí.

In November 2020, Verdú returned to football at Nou Barris-based CF Montañesa of the Tercera División, signing alongside his former Barcelona and Espanyol teammate Sergio García.

Club statistics

Notes

References

External links

1983 births
Living people
Spanish footballers
Footballers from Barcelona
Association football midfielders
La Liga players
Segunda División B players
Tercera División players
Tercera Federación players
FC Barcelona C players
FC Barcelona Atlètic players
FC Barcelona players
Deportivo de La Coruña players
RCD Espanyol footballers
Real Betis players
Levante UD footballers
CF Montañesa players
CE L'Hospitalet players
UAE Pro League players
Baniyas Club players
Serie A players
ACF Fiorentina players
China League One players
Qingdao F.C. players
Spain youth international footballers
Catalonia international footballers
Spanish expatriate footballers
Expatriate footballers in the United Arab Emirates
Expatriate footballers in Italy
Expatriate footballers in China
Spanish expatriate sportspeople in the United Arab Emirates
Spanish expatriate sportspeople in Italy
Spanish expatriate sportspeople in China